The Spider-Slayers are a group of robots that appear in the comic books published by Marvel Comics. Created by Stan Lee and Steve Ditko, the original Spider-Slayer first appeared in The Amazing Spider-Man #25 (June 1965). Primarily foes of Spider-Man, the first Spider-Slayer was built by scientist Spencer Smythe who created several more of the robots to combat the hero up until his death. Afterwards, several others made Spider-Slayers, including Alistair Alphonso Smythe.

Mark I

Appearing at the Daily Bugle, scientist Spencer Smythe offered his services to the newspaper's publisher, J. Jonah Jameson, claiming his Spider-Slayer could capture Spider-Man. At first dismissive of Smythe, Jameson is convinced to use the robot by Peter Parker (Spider-Man's civilian identity) who believed the Slayer could be easily defeated. Activating and using the machine via remote, Jameson used it to stalk Spider-Man (the Slayer's sensors being made to home in on arachnid signatures) through New York, it was able to climb walls and Spider-Man's webbing slid off it, it eventually ensnaring him in its coils. Despite being trapped, Spider-Man managed to tamper with the Slayer's circuitry, forcibly shutting it down. He then fools Jameson with an empty costume.

Several days after defeating the Slayer, Peter visited Smythe's laboratory, prompting the inert Slayer to spring to life and attack him. Before Smythe could deduce he is Spider-Man, Peter removed a jar of spiders from his pocket, claiming they were responsible for the robot attacking him, fooling Smythe, who deactivated the Slayer. When the newly created Molten Man trashed Smythe's lab (knocking the scientist out) the Slayer activated again and attacked Peter, who cut off the device's power supply with his webbing before Smythe could regain consciousness.

Years later, the Slayer would somehow fall into the hands of the villainous technopath the Reanimator, who added it to his collection of machinery. During a battle with Wolverine the Reanimator activated the Spider-Slayer Mark I and had it attack the hero, who easily defeated it.

A replica of the Spider-Slayer was built by Alistair Alphonso Smythe and destroyed by Spider-Man, who relived his first battle with the original Slayer after being flung back in time.

J. Jonah Jameson would reacquire the Slayer at some point, keeping it stored in his attic. During a dinner to get to know his new daughter-in-law, the She-Hulk, various issues come to a head. Jameson snapped and, using the Slayer (rechristening it the "She-Hulk Slayer"), battled the She-Hulk inside his own house, damaging it severely. The She-Hulk swiftly demolished the robot.

In the MC2 universe, Spider-Girl, Spider-Man's future daughter, was sent back in time. She encountered the original Spider-Slayer and, after some confusion involving Spider-Man and the Human Torch, managed to defeat the Slayer in a manner not too dissimilar to the way Spider-Man originally did.

The Mark I was covered in a special chemical coating which stopped Spider-Man's webbing and clinging abilities from working against it. The Spider-Slayer could also scale vertical surfaces and it also possessed several tentacles and coils, which it could use to ensnare enemies. It was equipped with a special sensor device that homed in a target which possessed 'spider-impulses'. As a result, it will chase and ensnare anything and anyone with the greatest amount of these characteristics (which, in most cases, is Spider-Man). The robot is basically humanoid in form and has a large monitor in the head which displays the operator's face, namely that of J. Jonah Jameson.

Mark II
More humanoid than its predecessor, the Mark II was also more powerful as well. Used by Jameson at first, Smythe later takes control of the machine, not wanting to merely capture Spider-Man but kill him for humiliating him by defeating the original Slayer. The second Slayer is destroyed when Spider-Man lures it into Smythe's own spider-filled lab, causing the machine's sensors to overload to the point that it shut down.

Alistair Alphonso Smythe later either reactivated, or built a replica of, the second Slayer to use against Spider-Man, who destroyed it.

The Mark II possessed super-strength and, like the first Slayer, it was covered in a chemical coating which caused it to be almost frictionless, meaning Spider-Man and his webbing could not stick to it. The Mark II could also discharge an energy beam from its head called the "Destructo-Beam". Like its predecessor, it is remotely controlled and has a monitor that displays its operator's face.

Mark III
The last of Smythe's Slayers to be used by J. Jonah Jameson, the Mark III resembled a large mechanical spider. After tracking down Spider-Man, the Slayer fought him and, at first, was no match for the hero until Smythe took control of the robot from Jameson. Knocking Spider-Man out, the Slayer left and was used by Smythe to steal lab equipment.

Another Mark III was used by Alistair Alphonso Smythe and was destroyed by Spider-Man, along with the rest of Alistair's revived Spider-Slayers.

This Spider-Slayer was capable of utilizing a built-in web-shooter of its own, meaning it could ensnare enemies much like Spider-Man; it also possessed a large retractable blade with which it could use as a weapon and cut Spider-Man's webbing. Like previous Spider-Slayers, this one was also covered in a non-stick coating, meaning Spider-Man could not use his webbing effectively against it.

Mark IV
A gigantic version of the Mark III, this Slayer was piloted by Smythe from the inside; the Mark IV managed to capture Spider-Man by ensnaring him in a web. Brought to Smythe's base, Spider-Man was left dangling upside-down while Smythe was directing his men to rob a bank. Breaking free, Spider-Man was attacked by the Slayer. Without Smythe to pilot it, the Slayer was much weaker and was temporarily defeated when Spider-Man clogged its web-shooters and shut it down internally. Defeating Smythe's henchmen, who were robbing various banks, Spider-Man was once again attacked by the Slayer, which was now piloted by Smythe. With little effort Spider-Man defeated the machine, revealing that, while inside it earlier, he had tampered with its circuitry, causing it to malfunction and shut down in battle.

The Mark IV later ambushed Spider-Man, who was weakened from previous battles and his own recent doubts - following a battle with the Jackal - over whether he was himself or his clone. However, when ensnared by the Slayer, Spider-Man realized - given that he instinctively thought of Mary Jane Watson while the clone would still love Gwen Stacy - that he was the real one, and subsequently managed to break free and smash open the Slayer's cockpit, knocking Smythe out.

The Mark IV was later rebuilt by Alistair Alphonso Smythe and used against Spider-Man, who destroyed it along with the rest of Alistair's Spider-Slayer army.

Possessing the same abilities as the Mark III, except on a larger scale, the Mark IV could also emit ethyl chloride spray to disorient victims.

Mark V

The Mark V was not created by Spencer Smythe, but by Dr. Marla Madison and J. Jonah Jameson. Tracking down Spider-Man, the Slayer engaged him in battle, as well as the Will o' the Wisp who was at the scene at the time. Though powerful, this Slayer was destroyed when Spider-Man caused a statue of Prometheus to collapse on top of it, crushing it.

The Reanimator would somehow acquire the Mark V and use it against Wolverine, who destroyed it again.

Despite the fact that it was not created by either him or his father, Alistair Alphonso Smythe had a duplicate of the Mark V in his Spider-Slayer army. This new Mark V was destroyed by Spider-Man, along with the rest of Alistair's Slayers.

The Mark V Spider-Slayer was rebuilt by an unidentified broker and purchased by Dracula, who used it to battle Deadpool. The robot was destroyed during the battle.

In 2018, J. Jonah Jameson rebuilt the Slayer and sent it to aid Spider-Man against the Red Goblin.

Unlike previous Spider-Slayers, the Mark V was controlled through mental commands transmitted through a special helmet, meaning this Slayer had better reaction time than previous ones. The Mark V also possessed super-strength, a web-shooter, and a laser-cannon which shot "Impulse Beams".

Mark VI
Used by a dying Spencer Smythe, the Mark VI proved to be Smythe's most powerful creation. Battling Spider-Man atop the Empire State Building, the Slayer proved to be more than a match for Spider-Man. It was only after Spider-Man knocked the Slayer and himself off the building that it was destroyed, plummeting at extreme speed to the ground below.

Another Mark VI was a part of Alistair Alphonso Smythe's Spider-Slayer army; unlike the original, this new one proved to be pathetic in comparison, being easily destroyed by Spider-Man.

The Mark VI possessed a large amount of weaponry and abilities; it had a web-cannon, laser-guns, metallic tentacles and coils, and the ability to stick to surfaces. It was also created out of an extremely durable metal (possibly secondary adamantium) which rendered it almost immune to physical damage. Like the Mark V, the Mark VI could be controlled mentally.

Mark VII
Though more of a battleship than a robot, the Mark VII was created by Spencer Smythe's son, Alistair Alphonso Smythe. Using the Mark VII to kidnap May Parker and Anna Watson, Smythe also attempted to use the device to kill Mary Jane Watson, who he believed to be Spider-Man (to buy time, she claimed to use an exo-suit created by aliens). Engaging the Slayer in battle, Spider-Man at first tried to short-circuit the ship by causing it to crash into a water tower. When this failed, Spider-Man managed to cause the ship to become entangled in some power-lines, which succeeded in causing it to short-circuit.

An unmanned version of the Mark VII was later used as a part of Alistair's Spider-Slayer army. This new Mark VII was destroyed by Spider-Man, along with the rest of Alistair's Slayers.

Piloted from the inside, the Mark VII possessed several weapons, which included extendable claws, electrical whips, and laser cannons. Unlike previous Spider-Slayers, the Mark VII was shown to be capable of flight.

Mark VIII
A gigantic robot, the Mark VIII was operated from within by the now-crippled Alistair Alphonso Smythe. Tracking down Spider-Man, Alistair was only briefly able to battle him, as the Mark VIII was damaged by a construction worker using a bulldozer. Alistair was forced to retreat from battle to repair the Slayer. Managing to track down Spider-Man once again, Alistair severely beat him and almost drowned him using the Slayer. It was only when Alistair attempted to kill Mary Jane that an enraged Spider-Man managed to rip apart the Slayer and tear Alistair out of its cockpit.

Alistair later rebuilt the Mark VIII and used it as a soldier in his Spider-Slayer army, which was destroyed by Spider-Man.

The Mark VIII was extremely powerful, seen capable of tearing apart steel. The Slayer also had extendable limbs and could shoot ethyl chloride from its fingers. Its head could fire off a powerful energy beam.

Mark IX (Ultimate Spider-Slayer)

The Mark IX was Alistair Alphonso Smythe himself, having, through self-inflicted mutations and cybernetic-implants, given himself superpowers.

Mark X
An alien-like robot, the Mark X was the first Spider-Slayer to attack Spider-Man in the "Invasion of the Spider-Slayers" saga. Attacking Spider-Man while he was swinging through town, the Mark X was close to eviscerating Spider-Man until a nearby construction worker managed to decapitate it using a jackhammer.

Alistair Alphonso Smythe later rebuilt the Mark X to be used in his Spider-Slayer army, which was destroyed by Spider-Man.

The Mark X was extremely fast and agile and had a large amount of spikes and claws protruding from its body.

Mark XI
A giant robotic bird, the Mark XI attacked Central Park while Peter Parker was there with his parents. Changing into Spider-Man, the Mark XI was easily defeated when Spider-Man smashed its head in.

The Spider-Slayer Mark XI was later rebuilt by Alistair Alphonso Smythe, who used it as a soldier in his Spider-Slayer army, which Spider-Man destroyed.

The Mark XI, along with being able to fly, was capable of shooting bolts of electricity from its mouth. It also had several retractable, bladed tentacles on its back.

Mark XII
A large, imposing humanoid Spider-Slayer that almost resembles Iron Man, Mark XII attacked Spider-Man while he was in the middle of a battle with Electro. After a long fight, Spider-Man managed to destroy the Spider-Slayer by trapping it in a building that was set to be demolished. The building subsequently collapsed before the Mark XII could escape.

The Mark XII was rebuilt by Alistair Alphonso Smythe to be used in his Spider-Slayer army, only to be destroyed by Spider-Man again.

The Mark XII was capable of flight, possessed super-strength and could also fire lasers from both its head and its arm, the latter of which was a laser-cannon.

Mark XIII
A biological-looking robot created by Alistair's assistant Max Young, the Mark XIII was a remake of one of Mendel Stromm's old Amoeboid robot and attacked Spider-Man while he and the Black Cat were battling the Scorpion. The Mark XIII ensnared Spider-Man in its tentacles and began to suffocate him. It was only when the Scorpion accidentally impaled the Slayer with his electrically charged stinger that it was destroyed. The feedback from his attack left the Scorpion unconscious as well.

The Mark XIII was later rebuilt by Alistair Alphonso Smythe as a member of his Spider-Slayer army, which was taken down by Spider-Man.

The Mark XIII was capable of stretching its body to extreme lengths and could also entrap enemies within itself, suffocating them. Its body was also extremely malleable, allowing it to twist and warp its shape.

Mark XIV
A robot designed by Max Young, but built by Alistair Alphonso Smythe, the Mark XIV possessed artificial intelligence and three distinct personalities (based on aspects of Max himself) in each of its three heads. Attacking Spider-Man and the Black Cat at a prison, the Mark XIV seemed to have the upper hand until Spider-Man caused the robot's minds to quarrel with one another; in the end, the Slayer blew up its own head.

Another Mark XIV, this one lacking a mind, was created by Alistair to be a soldier in his Spider-Slayer army and was destroyed by Spider-Man.

The Mark XIV could fly through the use of a jetpack, could shoot energy beams out of its fingers, and possessed super-strength. It also had several hook-ended tentacles.

A version of the armor was featured in the 1990s Spider-Man animated series, dubbed the 'Megaslayer'. While virtually identical in appearance and abilities, it featured only Smythe's profile on the face screen, not multiples to accommodate different personalities.

Mark XV
A giant robotic black widow spider. The Mark XV attacked Spider-Man and the Black Cat while the two were on a building. The Mark XV was easily defeated when the Black Cat cut the web-line it was hanging from, causing it to fall off the building. Revealed to have survived the fall, the Spider-Slayer combined with the Marks XVI and XVII to create one giant robot. This amalgamation of Spider-Slayers was destroyed when Spider-Man jammed a live cable into its circuitry.

Another Mark XV was a part of Alistair Alphonso Smythe's Spider-Slayer army. Along with the rest of the Slayer army, the new Mark XV was destroyed by Spider-Man.

The Mark XV had razor sharp legs and it could also spin webs and stick to surfaces.

Mark XV in other media
A Spider-Slayer called the "Black Widow" appeared in the 1990s Spider-Man animated series. In the episode "The Spider-Slayer", Spencer Smythe and Norman Osborn builds the first version to hunt down Spider-Man. However, it is destroyed after a battle with the hero at Spencer's lab, resulting in its creator's apparent death. In the episode "Return of the Spider-Slayers", Alistair Smythe works for the Kingpin to recreate a second version alongside two other Spider-Slayers which are able to combine.

Mark XVI
A giant robotic tarantula, the Mark XVI attacked Spider-Man and the Black Cat along with the Mark XVII. Shortly after appearing, the Mark XVI was thrown from a building. Surviving this fall, the Slayer combined with the Marks XV and XVII to create an enormous robot. This giant "Super-Slayer" was destroyed when Spider-Man jammed a live-cable into its circuitry.

Another Mark XVI appeared in Alistair Alphonso Smythe's Spider-Slayer army and was dismantled by Spider-Man.

The Mark XVI could jump extremely large distances and shoot webbing. It also, oddly, had pincers.

Mark XVI in other media
A Spider-Slayer called the "Tarantula" appeared in the 1990s Spider-Man animated series. In the episode "Return of the Spider-Slayers", Alistair Smythe works for the Kingpin to build this Spider-Slayer alongside two other Spider-Slayers which are able to combine.

Mark XVII
A giant robotic scorpion, the Mark XVII attacked Spider-Man and the Black Cat with the Mark XVI. After being thrown from a building, the Mark XVII merged with Marks XV and XVI to create an enormous robot. This combination of Spider-Slayers was destroyed when Spider-Man jammed a live-cable into its circuitry, causing it to catch fire internally.

The Mark XVII was rebuilt as a member of Alistair Alphonso Smythe's Spider-Slayer army and was destroyed once more by Spider-Man.

The Mark XVII was capable of shooting laser blasts from its "stinger" and its pincers were also super-powerful.

Mark XVII in other media
A Spider-Slayer called the "Scorpion" appeared in the 1990s Spider-Man animated series. In the episode "Return of the Spider-Slayers", Alistair Smythe works for the Kingpin to build this Spider-Slayer alongside two other Spider-Slayers, which are able to combine.

Mark XVIII
A member of Alistair Alphonso Smythe's army of Spider-Slayers, the Mark XVIII was humanoid with six arms. Attempting to attack May Parker's house, the Mark XVIII Spider-Slayer was tied up with webbing and subsequently torn apart by Spider-Man.

The Mark XVIII possessed super-strength; it could also stick to surfaces and fire energy beams from its head and hands.

Mark XIX
The Spider-Slayer Mark XIX was seen in the Secret War crossover. The person who built this Spider-Slayer is unknown, but it is possible it was either Lucia von Bardas or the Tinkerer. Aiding dozens of supervillains in combat during the Secret War, the status of the Mark XIX is currently unknown.

The full extent of the Mark XIX's powers is unknown; so far the only powers it was shown utilizing were the abilities to shoot laser beams and spit acid.

Other versions

Anti-Spider Squad
After Jameson becomes mayor of New York, he creates the Anti-Spider Squad, recycling the parts of several old Spider-Slayers to better equip them. At first enemies of Spider-Man, the Anti-Spider Squad, after aiding Spider-Man in foiling a plot of the Chameleon's, realized that Jameson's hatred of Spider-Man was unfounded and fanatical and quit his employ. Off-page, Jameson hired more men to be in the Anti-Spider Squad and his approval ratings declined as Spider-Man's approval had improved because of Jameson's large expenditures for the Anti-Spider Squad.

Cyber-Slayers
At the behest of mobster Jason Tso, Alistair Alphonso Smythe created the Cyber-Slayers, intent on selling them on the black market. Attaining most of the components needed to create the Cyber-Slayers, Alistair and Tso used them in a test run against rival gang leader Lady Octopus and her crew, a fight which the Scarlet Spider became involved in. Alistair and Tso later fled when the authorities became involved. When Lady Octopus and her gang attempted to steal the Cyber-Slayer's components, Alistair battled them, only to be betrayed by Tso, who wanted him out of the way so he could profit from the Cyber-Slayers alone. During the chaos, the visor controlling the Cyber-Slayers was accidentally destroyed.

The Cyber-Slayers were super-powerful, were capable of shooting lasers, and had several spikes protruding from their bodies.

Mini-Slayers
The Mini-Slayers were small spider-like robots used by Alistair Alphonso Smythe to spy on Spider-Man. Individually, Mini-Slayers are weak, though they can be a nuisance in large numbers. During the "Invasion of the Spider-Slayers" saga, Spider-Man captured a Mini-Slayer and used it to find Alistair's hideout. Afterward, the Mini-Slayers were wiped out by the FBI, Spider-Man, and the Avengers. Alistair also used Mini-Slayers to blackmail J. Jonah Jameson into helping him in a plot against Spider-Man, threatening to use the small robots on Jonah's family. When Alistair had his Spider-Slayer army attack Spider-Man, a Mini-Slayer managed to latch onto the hero's face and read his mind, transmitting thoughts of his loved ones to the other Slayers, who began to target them. Spider-Man managed to remove and destroy the Mini-Slayer, the rest of the Mini-Slayers deactivating after the Mark XVIII Spider-Slayer was destroyed.

When the Scorpion allied with Alistair to kill J. Jonah Jameson, Alistair had hundreds of Mini-Slayers follow the Scorpion to the Daily Bugle to aid him in assassinating Jonah. While battling Spider-Man and the She-Hulk, these Mini-Slayers combined to make a blob-like entity, which the duo destroyed. Alistair later used a Mini-Slayer to poison John Jameson, causing him to again become the Man-Wolf.

The Mini-Slayers are capable of sensing Spider-Man's location and adhering to surfaces. They can also combine with each other to form a larger, more powerful robot.

Villains
Three robots in the forms of the Vulture, the Sandman and the Kingpin were sent by Spencer Smythe to weaken and psychologically disorientate Spider-Man. When each robot was defeated, it would explode minute acid capsules throughout their bodies, leaving no trace of their presence and thus leaving Spider-Man doubting his own sanity. After all three robots were defeated, Smythe attacked Spider-Man in the Mark IV Spider-Slayer.

Each of the three robots had weakened versions of the powers of the villain they were based on. They also possessed super-strength.

Refitted Octobots - Spider-Man's Spider Slayers
Despite not being technically related to the Smythes' and Madison's creations, Spider-Man refits all of Doctor Octopus's confiscated Octobots and kept in the New York Police Precinct to carry an antidote able to reverse the mutations turning all the New York population into the Man-Spiders, and humorously renamed the devices his own "Spider-Slayers". Those impromptu Spider-Slayers have the same abilities and characteristics of Doctor Octopus's Octobots, but are telepathically linked to Peter Parker and programmed to seek the infected Man-Spiders. After the ordeal is over, Peter relinquishes his control over the devices.  However, consequentially, using this technology allowed Otto Octavius to capture more of Spider-Man's mind and able to deduce on his deathbed that Parker truly was Spider-Man. The result was that a golden Octobot had allowed Octavius and Parker to switch bodies, while retaining the memories of their counterparts, in a bid where Octavius attempted to escape death by having Parker die in Doctor Octopus's withering body.

References

Marvel Comics robots
Lists of Spider-Man characters